The 1980 UK & Ireland Greyhound Racing Year was the 54th year of greyhound racing in the United Kingdom and Ireland.

Roll of honour

Summary
The National Greyhound Racing Club (NGRC) released the annual returns, with totalisator turnover up 10%, at £81,290,642 but attendances down 15%, recorded at 5,484,781 from 5504 meetings. The increase in tote turnover indicated a significant increase in spend per head because attendances had decreased significantly. The decrease could partly be blamed on 200 less meetings but the fact that tracks charged a 17% tote retention would have been another factor. Regardless of blame it was the lowest attendance return on record, even less than the first full year of racing in 1927.

Sport Promoter, a brindle dog was voted Greyhound of the Year. He won Gold Collar at Catford Stadium and the Grand Prix at Walthamstow Stadium.

Tracks
Nottingham Greyhound Stadium opened on 24 January.

Ladbrokes closed Willenhall for development and cut prize money at Perry Barr and Monmore. Eastville Stadium suffered a major fire, and the majority of the south stand was destroyed causing more than £1 million worth of damage. Later in the year some consolation arrived in the form of a Bookmakers Afternoon Greyhound Service (BAGS) debut in November, and along with Hackney would become the backbone of the betting shop service. Monmore also joined the BAGS, which is currently supplied by White City Manchester, Hackney, Wembley and Harringay.

Bletchley in Milton Keynes under the new promotion of Reg Young rejoined the NGRC under the permit scheme and would become known as Milton Keynes Stadium instead of Bletchley. Maidstone and Long Eaton would leave the scheme and the Knott family sold their interest in Poole Stadium.

News
An outbreak of Parvovirus killed hundreds of pups in the early part of the year. The Greyhound Racing Association (GRA) continue to recover from their debt and repay creditors. Arthur Hancock retired as a trainer at Brighton and was replaced by GRA trainer Derek Knight who had previously been at Shawfield.

Ireland
The Bord na gCon increase prize money by a further 25%. Knockrour Slave won the Irish Laurels for the second successive year and break the Cork Greyhound Stadium track record in the final recording 29.00 sec.

Competitions
1979 Greyhound of the Year Desert Pilot reached the St Leger final at Wembley Greyhounds and performed well but lost out to Fair Reward trained by Bob Young with Decoy Sovereign runner up. Decoy Sovereign was trained by the Cobbold family Joe Cobbold and wife Doreen and had been bred by Brenda Baggs, wife of Gary Baggs who were helping the Cobbolds at the time. Decoy Sovereign easily won the Scottish Greyhound Derby final, the fawn dog defeated a good field. A greyhound called Rahan Ship has been ante post favourite for the Glasgow classic but had been withdrawn following the wrong form being printed in the racecard. The NGRC instigated an inquiry and some track officials lost their jobs before the dog returned to Ireland.

Principal UK races

Totalisator returns

The totalisator returns declared to the National Greyhound Racing Club for the year 1980 are listed below.

References 

Greyhound racing in the United Kingdom
Greyhound racing in the Republic of Ireland
UK and Ireland Greyhound Racing Year
UK and Ireland Greyhound Racing Year
UK and Ireland Greyhound Racing Year
UK and Ireland Greyhound Racing Year